21c or 21C may refer to:

21c (TV series), a Canadian newsmagazine
21c Museum Hotel, an American hotel chain
 Carbon-21 (21C), an isotope of carbon

See also
21st century
MIKE 21C
Techno Police 21C
C21 (disambiguation)